Walter Coats Givhan (May 7, 1902 – February 18, 1976) was an American politician. An unrepentant white supremacist, he served in both houses of the Alabama Legislature, where he was a strong proponent of racial segregation.

He was a member of the state sponsored Alabama State Sovereignty Commission, a state government organization created to fight the federal government mandated integration in schools after Brown v. Board of Education (1954).

References

External links
 

1902 births
1976 deaths
20th-century American politicians
American white supremacists
Democratic Party members of the Alabama House of Representatives
People from Dallas County, Alabama
American segregationists
Alabama Dixiecrats